M.V.Panneerselvam is an Indian Cinematographer who primarily works in the Tamil Film Industry. He has associated  with Directors like R. Parthiban , R. K. Selvamani and K. Subash. He has worked as a cinematographer in more than 25 films in Tamil.

Early life and career

After the graduation in Diploma in Film Technology from Adyar Film Institute, he started his career as a cinematographer in the movie Sugamana Sumaigal directed by R. Parthiepan. 
He is one of the cinematographers in the Guinness World Record film Suyamvaram, Tamil Dramedy film which is released in 1999, starring an ensemble cast from actors in the Tamil Film Industry and shot by a large technical team from the industry. 
He is well known for his cinematographic work in films such as Sugamana Sumaigal, Pullakuttikaran, Makkal Aatchi, Abhimanyu, Housefull, Roja Koottam etc.

Filmography

As cinematographer

As screenwriter
Mirugaa (2021)

References

External links
 
 
 

Living people
Tamil film cinematographers
Cinematographers from Tamil Nadu
M.G.R. Government Film and Television Training Institute alumni
Year of birth missing (living people)